The Basel Stock Exchange was a stock exchange in Basel, Switzerland between 1866 and 1993, where it merged into SWX Swiss Exchange.

Both buildings are apparently referred to as the Old Bourse.

Activities in the Basel Stock Exchange building ceased in 1998.

References 

Stock exchanges in Europe